The 2005 Indaiatuba Brazil tornado was a strong F3 multi-vortex wedge tornado that struck Indaiatuba, in São Paulo, Brazil. The tornado caused damage estimated at R$97.2 million (BRL), which caused the government to declare a state of public calamity. At the time, it was thought to be the first multi-vortex tornado to be recorded in the Southern Hemisphere.

Event 
A cold front that moved the state of São Paulo produced severe thunderstorms, one of which spawned the tornado. While the tornado was initially classified as an F1, it was reclassified as F3 a short while later after a more thorough analysis of damage was done. The tornado occurred on a Tuesday afternoon, leaving a path of significant damage through populated areas. The winds surpassed 125 mph.

Damage 
Three high-voltage towers were destroyed by the tornado in an area not far from the Toyota building. In all, 220 electric power poles were toppled and damaged, while schools, health posts, and part of the city hall were also heavily damaged or destroyed. At least 400 houses were damaged or destroyed as well; and strong winds knocked down walls, roofs, metal structures, poles, sheds, and trees.

Continuing its destructive path through the city, the tornado hit the neighborhoods Esplanada, Pau Preto, Remulo Zoppi, Cecap, Jardim Renata, Mercedes, Oliveira Camargo and Pimenta. However, the Industrial District was the hardest hit neighborhood. Several warehouses were severely damaged or destroyed, and the tornado lofted parts of the roofs of several structures, which were found at a distance of up to three kilometers away. Debris from structures was found strewn across the Santos Dumont highway as well. There were at least 400 companies in the industrial district, of which 15 were totally destroyed. In addition, all 720 companies lost electricity as a result of the tornado. The force of the wind knocked down and derailed 18 wagons that were empty and parked on the Ferroban lines in the Pimenta neighborhood, with each wagon weighing approximately 25 tons. The buildings of the National Industrial Service (Senai) were destroyed by the tornado, which dismantled the gate, and scattered debris throughout the area. Trees were uprooted and large fences were toppled over in this area as well. The tornado continued past this area some distance before dissipating.

Victims 
At least 60 people were left homeless, of which 35 were sent by the City Hall to the Maria Benedita Municipal School in Jardim Morada do Sol. The rest went to relatives' homes.

References 

Indaiatuba
Tornadoes in Brazil